The 2015–16 FC Erzgebirge Aue season is the 67th season in the football club's history and 1st season back and 3rd overall season in the third tier of German football, the 3. Liga, having been relegated from the 2. Bundesliga in 2015. The club finished 2nd in the 3. Liga, and were promoted back to the 2. Bundesliga. In addition to the 3. Liga, they participated in the DFB-Pokal, where they were eliminated in the round of 16. It was the 62nd season for the club at the Erzgebirgsstadion, located in Aue, Germany, which has a capacity of 15,690 seats.

Background
In the club's previous season in the 2. Bundesliga, they finished in 17th place, seeing them relegated to the 3. Liga, ending their five-season span in the 2. Bundesliga. In the DFB-Pokal, they went out in Round 2 after losing to RB Leipzig 1–3 after extra time.

Squad

On loan

Transfers

In

Out

Technical staff

Friendlies

Competitions

3. Liga

League table

Results summary

Results by round

Matches

DFB-Pokal

Notes

References

Erzgebirge Aue, FC
FC Erzgebirge Aue seasons